Manuel Justo Pardo y Lavalle (August 9, 1834 – November 16, 1878) was a Peruvian politician who served as the 20th President of Peru. He was the first civilian President in Peru's history.

Biography
Born into an aristocratic family of Lima, Peru, his father, Felipe Pardo y Aliaga, was a diplomatist and his mother, Petronila de Lavalle y Cabero, daughter of the 2nd Count of Premio Real.

He was educated at four schools: Commercial School of Valparaíso, National Institute of Chile, College of Our Lady of Guadalupe and San Carlos Convictorium. Lavalle studied philosophy at University of Barcelona and economics and literature at the Collège de France.

Pardo was Minister of Finance from 1865 to 1867. He was director of Public-Benefit Society of Lima (1868) and Mayor of Lima (1869–1870). On 24 April 1871, he founded the Civilista Party, the most important political party of the Aristocratic Republic. He was elected president by the Peruvian Congress after a failed coup launched by colonel Tomás Gutierrez.

One of the most controversial acts committed during his presidency was the signing of a Treaty of Defensive Alliance with Bolivia. The objective of this pact was to protect themselves from what they perceived as "Chilean Imperialism" and a growing desire of Chile for the allied provinces of Tarapacá and Litoral. 

On November 16, 1878, Manuel Pardo, President of the Senate, was assassinated by gunshot.

His sons were José Simón Pardo y Barreda, Prime-Minister and also President of Peru, Felipe Pardo y Barreda, V Marquis of Fuente Hermosa de Miranda, and Juan Pardo y Barreda, President of the Chamber of Deputies of Peru.

His sister, Mariana Pardo y Lavalle, married José Antonio de Lavalle, with whom she had children, including José Antonio and Hernando.

References

1834 births
1878 deaths
Pardo family
Lavalle family
Peruvian people of Spanish descent
Presidents of Peru
Peruvian Ministers of Economy and Finance
Presidents of the Senate of Peru
Deaths by firearm in Peru
People murdered in Peru
Assassinated Peruvian politicians
Civilista Party politicians
Politicians from Lima
National University of San Marcos alumni